The Ora Good Cat or Haomao is a battery electric compact car produced by Great Wall Motors under its electric vehicle brand, Ora since November 2020. It is marketed as the Ora Funky Cat in several markets, and GWM Ora in Australia.

Overview
The Haomao was first revealed at the Chengdu Auto Show on 24 July 2020 with a retro aesthetic styled by former Porsche designer Emanuel Derta. Sales of the vehicle in China began on 24 November 2020. Sales in Thailand began on 29 October 2021 with the vehicles being imported from China. GWM started marketing vehicle in the European market in 2022 as the Funky Cat.

Powertrains 
The Tech and Pro trim of the Good Cat offer a range of 400 km based on the NEDC standard from a 47.8-kWh lithium-iron phosphate battery. A front mounted electric motor rated at 143 PS (141 hp or 105 kW) and 210 Nm of torque offers the Good Cat a top speed of 152 km/h. The Ultra trim features a 63.1 kWh battery, increasing the electric range to 500 km based on the NEDC cycle, while retaining the same 143 PS/210 Nm electric motor.

GT

Safety
In September 2022, the vehicle was tested for automotive safety by Euro NCAP. It received five stars out of a possible five.

References

External links

Cars introduced in 2020
Subcompact cars
Front-wheel-drive vehicles
Hatchbacks
Production electric cars
Retro-style automobiles
Cars of China